Edgelaw Reservoir is an artificial reservoir in Midlothian, Scotland, UK, four miles west of Temple.

It was created in 1880 by James Leslie and his son Alexander.

See also
Gladhouse Reservoir
Glencorse Reservoir
North Esk Reservoir
Rosebery Reservoir
List of reservoirs and dams in the United Kingdom

References

External links
A Forest Habitat for Edinburgh and the Lothians
Geograph photo 32399, Edgelaw Reservoir
Geograph photo 711114, Edgelaw Reservoir
Bathymetrical Survey of the Fresh-Water Lochs of Scotland, 1897-1909

Reservoirs in Midlothian